Beidha ( al-baīḍā, "the white one"), also sometimes Bayda, is a major Neolithic archaeological site a few kilometres north of Petra near Siq al-Barid in Jordan.
 It is included in Petra's inscription as a UNESCO World Heritage Site.

Excavation history
It was first excavated by Diana Kirkbride in 1957 and later by Brian Byrd.

Periods of settlement
Three periods of occupation were detected: the Natufian period in the 11th millennium BC, a Pre-Pottery Neolithic B (PPNB) village with masonry construction in the 7th millennium BC and a Nabatean period dating to the 1st or 2nd century BC.

Natufian period
Natufian Beidha is characterized as a seasonal encampment, repeatedly occupied over a long period of time. Evidence from lithics recovered along with the layout and position of hearths and roasting areas suggested the occupants were primarily engaged in hunting related activities. This was supported by the absence of permanent buildings, storage, burials and large stone implements.

Neolithic period
The Neolithic stage at Beidha has been suggested to be one of the earliest villages with habitation dated between 7200 and 6500 BC. In the earliest PPNB phases, the population has been estimated at between 50 and 115 people. These villagers used stone masonry and built a wall around the settlement of round houses with subterranean floors. Its occupants cultivated barley and emmer wheat in an early state of domestication, herded goats, and hunted a variety of wild animals such as ibex and gathered wild plants, fruits and nuts. Burials were found in an area of the settlement thought to be used for ritual purposes. Evidence shows it was destroyed by fire c. 6650 BC and then rebuilt with rectangular, overground buildings and specialized workshops. At the height of habitation, the population has been estimated at anywhere between 125 and 235 people. Around 6500 BC the village was abandoned again, for unknown reasons. Many of the materials recovered came from some distance and included Anatolian obsidian and mother of pearl from the Red Sea. The transition to right-angled buildings shows an important development in human society that may have contributed the development of cities. There is also a structure dating from this period some yards east of the main site which has been interpreted as possibly being a temple for the practice of what may have been a pre-Abrahamic religion. (The layout of the structure is that of a temple, but there are no signs of any 'graven images' ever having been present.)

Nabataean period
There is also plentiful evidence of a renowned Nabataean settlement in the area including construction of a series of walls around agricultural terraces.

Site protection and development
The Jordanian Department of Antiquities, Petra Development and Tourism Region Authority, USAID/Jordan Tourism Development Project and the Council for British Research in the Levant announced in 2010 a project to protect and promote Beidha. This was suggested to take up to 18 months and planned to include an interpretative presentation and new visitor facilities.

See also

List of World Heritage Sites in the Arab States

References

External links
 The Megalithic Portal Entry
 Beidha - Photo gallery at Nabataea.net
Photos of Beidha at the Manar al-Athar photo archive

1957 archaeological discoveries
Petra
Neolithic settlements
Natufian sites
Archaeological type sites
Pre-Pottery Neolithic B